Hone Mohi Tawhai (c. 1827 – 31 July 1894) was a 19th-century Māori member of the New Zealand parliament.

Hone Mohi Tawhai was born in the Hokianga in 1827 or 1828. He was about 12 years old when his father signed the Treaty of Waitangi in February 1840.

In the 1860s he was involved in a district runanga (tribal council) set up by Governor Grey. Later he was made a Native Land Court assessor. By the mid-1870s he became disillusioned with the Native Land Court and began to call for Maori control over land title and land alienation.

He represented the Northern Maori electorate from 1879 when he defeated Hori Tawhiti, to 1884 when he retired. He debated effectively on a number of race relations issues. In 1879 there were doubts about his election, and the Elections Validation Act, 1879  validated the election of Cobeck and two other MHRs, William Henry Colbeck and Wiremu te Wheoro.

In 1881 and 1882 he promoted a Native Committees Bill to limit the power of the Native Land Court, and give Maori control of awarding land titles.

Tawhai died on 31 July 1894.

References

1830s births
1894 deaths
New Zealand MPs for Māori electorates
Members of the New Zealand House of Representatives
Māori politicians
People from the Hokianga
19th-century New Zealand politicians